Cindy Haasch (born 19 August 2004) is a German nordic combined skier.

She participated at the individual event at the FIS Nordic World Ski Championships 2021.

References

External links

Living people
2004 births
German female Nordic combined skiers
21st-century German women